Prativa Sundari  Devi Narayan of Cooch Bihar, also known as Princess Mander, was an Indian princess of the princely state of Cooch Behar, British India. She was born at Lily Cottage, Calcutta, on 22 November 1891, the second daughter of H.H. Sri Sri Maharaja Sir Nripendra Narayan Bhup Bahadur, Maharaja of Cooch Behar, by his wife H.H. Maharani Sunity Devee Sahiba, sometime Regent of Cooch-Behar and President of the State Council. She married at Woodlands, Calcutta, on 21 February 1912 Miles Mander, actor, film director and author, and brother of Geoffrey Mander of Wightwick Manor, without issue, who petitioned for a divorce, granted on 24 May 1922. She died at Calcutta, 23 July 1923.

See also
Mander family
Sunity Devee (1921), The Autobiography of an Indian Princess, London: J. Murray, on the Internet Archive

References

1923 deaths
1891 births